Lukunga is an area of the capital city of Kinshasa, Democratic Republic of the Congo, comprising seven of the city-province's twenty-four administrative divisions—the communes of Barumbu, Gombe, Kinshasa, Kintambo, Lingwala, Mont Ngafula and Ngaliema.  It is one of the four so-called districts of Kinshasa. These were the administrative divisions of Kinshasa during much of the Mobutu years (1965-1997) and around which a number of government systems and services are still organized.  For instance, Lukunga makes up a fourteen-member National Assembly constituency designated as Kinshasa I.  However, these districts are not part of Congo's territorial organization.

The district takes its name from the Lukunga River.
This is a critical source of water for the district, compromised by silting.

References

Districts of Kinshasa